Donald Michael Smith (born October 30, 1963) is a former American football running back in the National Football League (NFL), after a successful college football career at Mississippi State University as a quarterback.  After two seasons with the Buccaneers, Smith was signed by the Buffalo Bills, mainly to be their kick returner.  He caught a career high 21 passes for 225 yards in 1990, while also returning 32 kickoffs for 643 yards.  He scored a touchdown in Super Bowl XXV for the Bills in what turned out to be the final carry of his career. This was the Buffalo Bills' first touchdown in Super Bowl history.

College statistics

References

External links
 NFL.com player page

1963 births
Living people
American football quarterbacks
American football running backs
Buffalo Bills players
Miami Dolphins players
Mississippi State Bulldogs football players
Tampa Bay Buccaneers players
People from Monroe County, Mississippi
Players of American football from Mississippi
Ed Block Courage Award recipients